Major Moses Corbet (1728–1814) was a British Army officer who served as Lieutenant Governor of Jersey from 4 April 1771 to 6 January 1781.

Early career
Corbet joined the British Army c.1745. In 1748 he was an Ensign in the 7th Regiment of Foot and by the start of the Seven Years' War he had been promoted to Captain, sailing with his regiment from Ireland to help relieve the Siege of Fort St Philip (1756) in Menorca. The relief failed and his regiment moved to Gibraltar where he served until ill health forced his return to England.

Whilst in England he married and became Aide-de-camp to Lieutenant Colonel Lord Robert Bertie the commander of the 7th Regiment of Foot He rejoined the regiment in Gibraltar and received promotion to Major on 14 December 1761 within the 7th Regiment of Foot. Returning with the regiment to England, he left the army because of ill health and settled back in Jersey Channel Islands.

Becoming involved in politics and following corn riot disturbances in 1769, was appointed Lieutenant Governor of Jersey on 4 April 1771.

In 1779 the Franco-Dutch Invasion of Jersey was attempted at St Ouen's Bay. The defenders, led by Moses Corbet, were able to prevent the landing, suffering only a few men wounded when a cannon burst.

Battle of Jersey 

On 6 January 1781 a French invading force led by Philippe de Rullecourt secured the town of Saint Helier and surprised Corbet in bed in Government House (then situated at Le Manoir de La Motte). De Rullecourt convinced Corbet that thousands of French troops had already overwhelmed Jersey. He threatened to burn the town and slaughter the inhabitants if the garrison did not capitulate and Corbet, unable to ascertain the true situation, surrendered. Major Francis Peirson, suspecting that De Rullecourt only had a small force, took command of the British troops in Corbet's absence and counter-attacked leading to a decisive engagement in which the British forces were victorious.

Corbet was subsequently tried by Court-martial at Horseguards.

The charges were 
 Allowing himself to be surprised by the enemy
 Signing articles of capitulation when a prisoner
 Attempting to induce other officers in command to concur

The French General had written the capitulation letter in his own hand and to get Corbet to sign threatened to destroy the town and shipping in the harbour, disclosing in great detail the defences of the Island, leading Corbet to believe many units had been captured and wishing to save the town from destruction by fire, and believing his powers of command had already been removed as he was a prisoner, agreed to sign. Corbet received good references from Lord Robert Bertie and others. The outcome of the Court Martial was inconclusive; he was dismissed as Lieutenant-Governor, but granted a pension of £250 p.a. for life.

Portrait
A formal full-length portrait of Major Moses Corbet's portrait was created by noted artist Philippe Jean (1755–1802). Philippe Jean was made famous for his miniature portrait of Guernsey born Sir Isaac Brock as well as his commissioned portrait of King George III.

References

1728 births
1814 deaths
Governors of Jersey
British Army personnel of the American Revolutionary War
British Army personnel of the Seven Years' War
Royal Fusiliers officers
British Army personnel who were court-martialled